The Book of Ezra is a book of the Hebrew Bible; which formerly included the Book of Nehemiah in a single book, commonly distinguished in scholarship as Ezra–Nehemiah. The two became separated with the first printed rabbinic bibles of the early 16th century, following late medieval Latin Christian tradition. Composed in Hebrew and Aramaic, its subject is the Return to Zion following the close of the Babylonian captivity, and it is divided into two parts, the first telling the story of the first return of exiles in the first year of Cyrus the Great (538 BC) and the completion and dedication of the new Temple in Jerusalem in the sixth year of Darius I (515 BC), the second telling of the subsequent mission of Ezra to Jerusalem and his struggle to purify the Jews from marriage with non-Jews. Together with the Book of Nehemiah, it represents the final chapter in the historical narrative of the Hebrew Bible.

Ezra is written to fit a schematic pattern in which the God of Israel inspires a king of Persia to commission a leader from the Jewish community to carry out a mission; three successive leaders carry out three such missions, the first rebuilding the Temple, the second purifying the Jewish community, and the third sealing the holy city itself behind a wall. (This last mission, that of Nehemiah, is not part of the Book of Ezra.) The theological program of the book explains the many problems its chronological structure presents. It probably appeared in its earliest version around 399 BC, and continued to be revised and edited for several centuries before being accepted as scriptural in the early Christian era.

Summary 
The Book of Ezra consists of ten chapters: chapters 1–6, covering the period from the Cyrus the Great to the dedication of the Second Temple, are told in the third person; chapters 7–10, dealing with the mission of Ezra, are told largely in the first person. The book contains several documents presented as historical inclusions, written in Aramaic while the surrounding text is in Hebrew (1:2–4, 4:8–16, 4:17–22, 5:7–17, 6:3–5, 6:6–12, 7:12–26) 

Chapters 1–6 (documents included in the text in italics)
1. Decree of Cyrus, first version: Cyrus, inspired by God, returns the Temple vessels to Sheshbazzar, "prince of Judah", and directs the Israelites to return to Jerusalem with him and rebuild the Temple.
2. 42,360 exiles, with men servants, women servants and "singing men and women", return from Babylon to Jerusalem and Judah under the leadership of Zerubbabel and Jeshua the High Priest.
3. Jeshua the High Priest and Zerubbabel build the altar and celebrate the Feast of Tabernacles. In the second year the foundations of the Temple are laid and the dedication takes place with great rejoicing.

4. Letter of the Samaritans to Artaxerxes, and reply of Artaxerxes: The "enemies of Judah and Benjamin" offer to help with the rebuilding, but are rebuffed; they then work to frustrate the builders "down to the reign of Darius." The officials of Samaria write to king Artaxerxes warning him that Jerusalem is being rebuilt, and the king orders the work to stop. "Thus the work on the house of God in Jerusalem came to a standstill until the second year of the reign of Darius king of Persia."
5. Tattenai's letter to Darius: Through the exhortations of the prophets Haggai and Zechariah, Zerubbabel and Joshua recommence the building of the Temple. Tattenai, satrap over both Judah and Samaria, writes to Darius warning him that Jerusalem is being rebuilt and advising that the archives be searched to discover the decree of Cyrus.
6. Decree of Cyrus, second version, and decree of Darius: Darius finds the decree, directs Tattenai not to disturb the Jews in their work, and exempts them from tribute and supplies everything necessary for the offerings. The Temple is finished in the month of Adar in the sixth year of Darius, and the Israelites assemble to celebrate its completion.

Chapters 7–10
7. Letter of Artaxerxes to Ezra (Artaxerxes' rescript): King Artaxerxes is moved by God to commission Ezra "to inquire about Judah and Jerusalem with regard to the Law of your God" and to "appoint magistrates and judges to administer justice to all the people of Trans-Euphrates—all who know the laws of your God." Artaxerxes gives Ezra much gold and directs all Persian officials to aid him.

8. Ezra gathers a large body of returnees and much gold and silver and precious vessels for the Temple and camps by a canal outside Babylon. There he discovers he has no Levites, and so sends messengers to gather some. The exiles then return to Jerusalem, where they distribute the gold and silver and offer sacrifices to God.
9. Ezra is informed that some of the Jews already in Jerusalem have married non-Jewish women. Ezra is appalled at this proof of sin, and prays to God: "O God of Israel, you are righteous! We are left this day as a remnant. Here we are before you in our guilt, though because of it not one of us can stand in your presence."
10. Despite the opposition of some of their number, the Israelites assemble and send away their foreign wives and children.

Historical background 

In the early 6th century BC, the Kingdom of Judah rebelled against the Neo-Babylonian Empire and was destroyed. As a result, the royal court, the priests, the prophets and scribes were taken into captivity in the city of Babylon. There a profound intellectual revolution took place, the exiles blaming their fate on disobedience to their God and looking forward to a future when he would allow a purified people to return to Jerusalem and rebuild the Temple in Jerusalem. The same period saw the rapid rise of Persia, previously an unimportant kingdom in present-day southern Iran, to a position of great power, and in 539 BC Cyrus II, the Persian ruler, conquered Babylon.

It is difficult to describe the parties and politics of Judea in this period because of the lack of historical sources, but there seem to have been three important groups involved: the returnees from the exile who claimed the reconstruction with the support of Cyrus II; "the adversaries of Judah and Benjamin"; and a third group, "people of the land", who seem to be local opposition against the returnees building the Temple in Jerusalem.

The following table is a guide to major events in the region during the period covered by the Book of Ezra:

Texts

Ezra–Nehemiah

The single Hebrew book Ezra–Nehemiah, with title "Ezra", was translated into Greek around the middle of the 2nd century BC.  The Septuagint calls Esdras B to Ezra–Nehemiah and Esdras A to 1 Esdras respectively; and this usage is noted by the early Christian scholar Origen, who remarked that the Hebrew 'book of Ezra' might then be considered a 'double' book. Jerome, writing in the early 5th century, noted that this duplication had since been adopted by Greek and Latin Christians.  Jerome himself rejected the duplication in his Vulgate  translation of the Bible into Latin from the Hebrew; and consequently all early Vulgate manuscripts present Ezra-Nehemiah as a single book,.  However, from the 9th century onwards, Latin bibles are found that for the first time separate the Ezra and Nehemiah sections of Ezra-Nehemiah as two distinct books, then called the first and second books of Ezra; and this becomes standard in the Paris Bibles of the 13th century. It was not until 1516/17, in the first printed Rabbinic Bible of Daniel Bomberg that the separation was introduced generally in Hebrew Bibles.

First Esdras
1 Esdras, also known as "Esdras α", is an alternate Greek-language version of Ezra. This text has one additional section, the 'Tale of the Three Guardsmen' in the middle of Ezra 4. 1 Esdras (3 Esdras in the Vulgate) was considered apocryphal by Jerome.

Date, structure and composition

Date

Koresh of Ezra 1:1 is called "king of Persia", which title was introduced  not by Cyrus the Great but by his grandson and probable namesake Xerxes (486–465 BC).

Scholars are divided over the chronological sequence of the activities of Ezra and Nehemiah. Ezra 7:8 says that Ezra arrived in Jerusalem in the seventh year of king Artaxerxes, while Nehemiah 2:1–9 has Nehemiah arriving in Artaxerxes' twentieth year. If this was Artaxerxes I (465–424 BC), then Ezra arrived in 458 and Nehemiah in 445 BC. Nehemiah 8–9, in which the two (possibly by editorial error) appear together, supports this scenario.

Structure
The contents of Ezra–Nehemiah are structured in a theological rather than chronological order: "The Temple must come first, then the purifying of the community, then the building of the outer walls of the city, and so finally all could reach a grand climax in the reading of the law."

The narrative follows a repeating pattern in which the God of Israel "stirs up" the king of Persia to commission a Jewish leader (Zerubbabel, Ezra, Nehemiah) to undertake a mission; the leader completes his mission in the face of opposition; and success is marked by a great assembly. The tasks of the three leaders are progressive: first the Temple is restored (Zerubabbel), then the community of Israel (Ezra), and finally the walls which will separate the purified community and Temple from the outside world (Nehemiah). The pattern is completed with a final coda in which Nehemiah restores the belief of Yahweh. This concern with a schematic pattern-making, rather than with history in the modern sense of a factual account of events in the order in which they occurred, explains the origin of the many problems which surround both Ezra and Nehemiah as historical sources.

Composition
Twentieth-century views on the composition of Ezra revolved around whether the author was Ezra himself (and who may have also authored the Books of Chronicles) or was another author or authors (who also wrote the Chronicles). More recently it has been increasingly recognised that Ezra, Nehemiah and Chronicles all have extremely complex histories stretching over many stages of editing, and most scholars now are cautious of assuming a unified composition with a single theology and point of view. As an indication of the many layers of editing which Ezra has undergone, one recent study finds that Ezra 1–6 and Ezra 9–10 were originally separate documents, that they were spliced together at a later stage by the authors of Ezra 7–8, and that all have undergone extensive later editing.

Persian documents 
Seven purported Persian decrees of kings or letters to and from high officials are quoted in Ezra. Their authenticity has been contentious; while some scholars accept them in their current form, most accept only part of them as genuine, while still others reject them entirely. L.L. Grabbe surveys six tests against which the documents can be measured (comparative known Persian material, linguistic details, contents, presence of Jewish theology, the Persian attitude to local religions, and Persian letter-writing formulas) and concludes that all the documents are late post-Persian works and probable forgeries, but that some features suggest a genuine Persian correspondence behind some of them.

See also
Esdras
Ezra-Nama
Ezra-Nehemiah

References

External links 

Commentaries
Blenkinsopp, Joseph, "Ezra-Nehemiah: A Commentary" (Eerdmans, 1988)
Blenkinsopp, Joseph, "Judaism, the first phase" (Eerdmans, 2009)
Coggins, R.J., "The Books of Ezra and Nehemiah" (Cambridge University Press, 1976)
Ecker, Ronald L., "Ezra and Nehemiah", Ecker's Biblical Web Pages, 2007.
Fensham, F. Charles, "The books of Ezra and Nehemiah" (Eerdmans, 1982)
Grabbe, L.L., "Ezra-Nehemiah" (Routledge, 1998)
Grabbe, L.L., "A history of the Jews and Judaism in the Second Temple Period, Volume 1" (T&T Clark, 2004)
Pakkala, Juha, "Ezra the scribe: the development of Ezra 7–10 and Nehemiah 8" (Walter de Gryter, 2004)
Throntveit, Mark A., "Ezra-Nehemiah" (John Knox Press, 1992)

Translations
 Ezra (Judaica Press) – translation [with Rashi's commentary] at Chabad.org
 Bible Gateway (opens at NIV version)
 Ezra – King James Version
 

 
4th-century BC books
Ezra, Book of
Ezra
Historical books